Carl Nettles Reynolds (February 1, 1903 – May 29, 1978) was an American outfielder in Major League Baseball who played for the Chicago White Sox (1927–31), Washington Senators (1932, 1936), St. Louis Browns (1933), Boston Red Sox (1934–35) and Chicago Cubs (1937–39). He was born in LaRue, Texas, and attended Southwestern University. He hit and threw right-handed.

Career
Reynolds was a consistent hitter who batted .300 six times. He played all three outfield positions, but was suited to right field, especially since he had a good throwing arm.

Reynolds enjoyed his best season in 1930, with career highs in batting average (.359), home runs (22), RBI (104), runs (103), hits (202), triples (18) and games played (138). On July 2, he hit three home runs in consecutive at bats.

In the first game of a Senators-Yankees doubleheader on July 4, 1932, Reynolds sustained a broken jaw when he was punched by Bill Dickey after a collision at home plate. Dickey was suspended for 30 days and fined $1000 and Reynolds did not play again until August 13.

In his 13-year career, Reynolds was a .302 hitter with 80 home runs and 699 RBI over 1,222 games. Defensively, he posted a .970 fielding percentage at all three outfield positions.

Reynolds died in 1978 in Houston, TX at the age of 75.

See also

 List of Major League Baseball career triples leaders

References

External links
 
, or Baseball Library, or Retrosheet, or SABR Biography Project, or The Baseball Page, or The DeadBall Era

1903 births
1978 deaths
Baseball players from Texas
Boston Red Sox players
Chicago White Sox players
Chicago Cubs players
Lon Morris Bearcats baseball players
Los Angeles Angels (minor league) players
Major League Baseball right fielders
Minneapolis Millers (baseball) players
Palestine Pals players
People from Henderson County, Texas
Southwestern Pirates baseball players
St. Louis Browns players
Washington Senators (1901–1960) players